Public Illumination Magazine (PIM) is an artists' periodical published since 1979, notable for its tiny size (11 × 7 cm). Each issue features a given topic. The general flavor of the contents ranges from parody to the absurd, with brevity a constant.

Public Illumination Magazine mocks the traditions of mainstream magazines. The pocket-size of the magazine, its use of pseudonyms, and its irreverent tone tweak the expectations produced by the large format glossy magazines. Long-time writers include: Sophie D. Lux, Fitty Sense, Rank Cologne, mr Basho and the King of France. The use of such pseudonyms is intended to mock contemporary mainstream magazines' obsession with celebrity. 

Founded in underground art and literary circles in lower Manhattan by Zagreus Bowery; originally "non-weekly", later "non-monthly", then "non-biannual", it is now "non-occasional" and published in Italy.

Writers and artists who have contributed include: Ken Brown, Steve Dalachinsky, Keith Haring, Michael Madore, David Sandlin, Hal Sirowitz, Sparrow, Mike Topp, David Wojnarowicz, and Diane Torr.

Complete series of the magazine are held by the Museum of Modern Art in New York and the Pompidou Center in Paris.

Through 2017, 60 issues have been published covering the following themes:
 Telephones
 Virulence
 Mass Transit
 Little Girls
 Cosmetic Mutilation
 Livestock
 War Games
 Habits
 The Truth
 Husbands
 Artifice
 Tongues
 Civilization
 Rejects
 Idols
 Pain & Sorrow
 Excess
 Scales
 Technique
 Races
 Contraception
 Disguise
 Comestibles
 Vermin
 Flora & Fauna
 Heredity
 Instruments
 Propaganda
 Home
 Water Sports
 The Future
 Miracles
 Casualties
 Foreigners
 Youth
 Secrets
 Organs
 Fun
 Mother
 Hallucinations
 Underwear
 Enemies
 Shadows
 Neighbors
 Balls
 Busts
 Luxury
 Hair
 Climate
 Bullshit
 Passion
 Space
 Trash
 Spice
 Doom & Gloom
 Lethargy
 Vehicles
 Fortune
 Flesh
 Heaven

Notes

Sources
  p140
  p225

External links
 Public Illumination Magazine website
 Public Illumination Magazine WorldCat entry

Magazines established in 1979
Visual arts magazines published in the United States
Zines